Blairmorite is a very rare porphyritic volcanic rock named after the community of Blairmore in southwestern Alberta, Canada. It is characterized by dominant analcime phenocrysts in a matrix of analcime, sanidine and alkalic pyroxene with accessory titanite, melanite and nepheline. It is a leucocratic variety of analcimite (a foidite). Blairmorite has also been described as an analcime-rich variety of phonolite. 

This extrusive igneous rock is known from only two geological formations worldwide. The foremost blairmorite occurrence is the Crowsnest Formation in the Canadian province of Alberta where it is associated with agglomerates and tuffs from explosive eruptions. The other locality is the Lupata Gorge in Mozambique.

References

Volcanic rocks
Porphyritic rocks
Crowsnest Pass, Alberta